S. S. Seward Institute is the secondary school in the Florida Union Free School District in Orange County, New York, United States. It is located along Main Street (NY 17A/94) in the village of Florida and referred to locally as just "Seward".

The student body consists of grades 6-12, drawn from Florida and surrounding portions of the towns of Chester, Goshen and Warwick.

The school gets its name from Samuel S. Seward, who settled in the region in the early 19th century and established both a medical practice and a mercantile business. Seward was also active in politics, serving as a member of the New York State Assembly in 1804 and, for many years, as a judge in the Orange County Court.  In 1846, Seward started the school with an endowment of $20,000. One of his sons, William Henry Seward, attended one of the institute's predecessors for a time, and later began a career in public service that culminated in the purchase of Alaska while Secretary of State. A memorial to him is located on Main Street in front of the school.

Athletics
With the smallest population of any secondary school in Orange County, Seward is the rare American public high school that does not field a football team in the fall. Despite this, the Spartans have had very successful sports teams over the years, winning state titles in baseball (1999), boys basketball (2003) and girls soccer (1987, 2007 and 2008), making Seward the smallest school in New York to win state titles in three different sports. In June 2009, they won their first softball section title. In the fall of 2009 they created their first varsity volleyball team. The Cross Country team has also reached a high level of success capturing three straight boy's section titles (2008, 2009, and 2010) and won the section title for the Lady Spartans in (2009). The Spartans cheerleading team is also very successful during year (2016) the girls won OCIAA 's and made it to the NY state championships and put up a strong fight.

References

External links 
School website

Public high schools in New York (state)
Public middle schools in New York (state)
Schools in Orange County, New York